Sonia Gordon Brown (January 11, 1890–c. 1965) was a Russian-American sculptor.

Sonia Gordon Brown, née Sonia F. Rosental,  was born in Moscow, Russia on January 11, 1890. She studied in Russia, with Nikolay Andreyev and Valentin Serov, and later in Paris, with Antoine Bourdelle. She later moved to New York.
Brown served as president of the New York Society of Women Artists in 1927.

Her work is included in the permanent collection of the Whitney Museum of Modern Art.

References 

Women artists from the Russian Empire
20th-century American women artists
20th-century American artists
American women sculptors
1890s births
1966 deaths
Emigrants from the Russian Empire to the United States